Atomic Heart is a single-player first-person shooter developed by Mundfish and published by Focus Entertainment and 4Divinity. The game was released for the PlayStation 4, PlayStation 5, Windows, Xbox One, and Xbox Series X/S on February 21, 2023. The game received generally positive reviews upon release. However, it has been the subject of controversy over its alleged Russian links.

Gameplay 

Atomic Heart is a first-person shooter video game with role-playing elements. The combat consists of shooting and slashing with improvised weapons. A wide variety of enemies are featured, which may be mechanical, biomechanical, biological, and some of which are airborne. A crafting system allows the player to piece weapons together from metal parts that can be detached from robots or taken from household appliances. Weapons can be upgraded via a mechanic called "casettes". Ammo in the game is scarce, and there is a stealth option. Quick-time events are featured in the game. The player wears a special glove, the Polymer Glove, which grants powers such as telekinesis, freezing, and electricity to defeat foes. Its powers can be combined with both melee and ranged weapons.

Ammunition can be upgraded with various elemental effects using "canisters". These canisters can be looted and crafted, and equipped by the player on both melee and ranged weapons. If the canister depletes, it is discarded from the player's inventory.

Plot

Setting 
Atomic Heart takes place on the grounds of Facility 3826, the Soviet Union's foremost scientific research hub in an alternate history 1955. In 1936, scientist Dmitry Sechenov developed a liquidized programmable module called the Polymer, sparking massive technological breakthroughs in the fields of energy and robotics in the USSR and freeing much of the populace from manual labor. When World War II broke out, the Soviets quickly gained the upper hand, but just before Nazi Germany was defeated in 1942 they unleashed the Brown Plague virus, leaving millions dead and creating an international demand for Soviet robots to compensate for the resulting worker shortage. As part of the Soviet Union's post-war reconstruction programme, Dr. Sechenov created a wireless, networked artificial intelligence called "Kollektiv 1.0" that linked his robots together for greater efficiency.

Most recently, Sechenov developed the THOUGHT neuroconnector, a device that integrates Polymer into the human body and allows humans to remotely interface with robots. THOUGHT is to be released alongside Kollektiv 2.0, and Sechenov boasts that it will usher in a true post-labor era for the entire world. However, Kollektiv 2.0's official launch on 13 June 1955 goes awry, plunging Facility 3826 into chaos.

Synopsis 
Agent P-3 is a WWII veteran with memory problems. He is invited to assist in the rollout of Kollektiv 2.0 at Facility 3826, but he finds that robots massacred most human personnel. Sechenov explains that Petrov sabotaged the Kollektiv 1.0 node and asks P-3 to apprehend Petrov. With his AI partner CHAR-les (nicknamed "Charles") attached to his glove, P-3 must confront homicidal robots and failed biomechanical experiments while dealing with growing mental instability.

P-3 tracks down Petrov and finds out that he is working with Filatova. Petrov flees and is apparently killed by a robot. Meanwhile, the Politburo grows suspicious about what is happening. Molotov, a member of the Politburo threatens to shut down Sechenov's "Atomic Heart" project. Charles explains to P-3 that Sechenov and the Politburo are in a struggle over who will control Kollektiv. Sechenov orders P-3 to intercept Molotov, but once P-3 makes contact, he blacks out and wakes up to find Molotov murdered. 

As P-3 continues to pursue Petrov, who rants about how Sechenov plans to enslave the world. He tells P-3 that the rogue robots had a combat mode installed beforehand. Viktor then gives P-3 a pair of rings and commits suicide. When Sechenov asks about the rings, P-3 lies, and concludes that Sechenov and the Politburo's "Atomic Heart" project involves distributing combat robots disguised as civilian robots to seize nuclear power plants. P-3 takes Petrov's head to a lab to extract his memories, but Filatova destroys the machine and knocks P-3 out.

When P-3 wakes up, Filatova reveals to him that Kollektiv is a means to mind-control people. Shocked, P-3 works with Filatova to find out the truth from Sechenov. In the lab, P-3 discovers that Charles isn't an AI, but the mind of Chariton Zakharov, Sechenov's friend and a fellow researcher presumably murdered by Sechenov. Using Zakharov's security clearance, they uncover more of P-3's past. P-3 learns that in order to fix his brain injury, Sechenov installed a Polymer implant, erasing memories of his deceased wife Ekaterina, and giving Sechenov the ability to control him. Furious, P-3 decides to confront Sechenov.

However, P-3 blacks out again and wakes up in the care of his mother-in-law. She reveals that P-3 had killed Filatova while blacked out. At this point, P-3 can either choose to leave Facility 3826 or confront Sechenov, resulting in different endings.

Development and release 
Atomic Heart is developed by Mundfish, which styles itself as an international studio headquartered in Cyprus and has offices in Moscow and Saint Petersburg. Russian news websites have repeatedly referred to it as a Russian game, while investors include GEM capital, the founder of which served as a Gazprom division director.

The team has previously developed the VR game Soviet Lunapark, but ceased development and delisted the game in late 2018 to focus on Atomic Heart. The studio uses Unreal Engine 4 and was advertised to support Nvidia RTX and DLSS technologies for the GeForce RTX graphics cards. However, RTX has not been implemented in the release version of the game. Mundfish stated that they will add the feature "post-launch", without giving any further details.

In February 2022 a story trailer showed that Atomic Heart will launch in "#######BER", suggesting the game's release some time in Q4 2022. However, later in November, it was announced that the game will be released on February 21, 2023, published by VK Play in the CIS, co-published by 4Divinity from Singapore-based entertainment marketing group GCL in Asia, and published by French-based company Focus Entertainment elsewhere.

Controversy 
Atomic Heart developer Mundfish has been accused of harvesting data of users based in Russia and providing it to Russia's security services. The developer has denied the allegations. While Mundfish itself has no direct ties to Russian president Putin, its publisher and some of its investors are.
 
The game has become subject of controversy due in part of its anticipated release date, which nearly coincided with the first year anniversary of the 2022 Russian invasion of Ukraine and Defender of the Fatherland Day. Critics had questioned the timing of the release of a game featuring Soviet and Russian military themes. Mundfish claimed that the company is neutral in world affairs and "do not comment on politics or religion" and the studio is "is undeniably a pro-peace organization against violence against people". The Ukrainian Ministry of Digital Transformation criticised the statement for its vagueness, saying "the developers of the game did not come out with a public statement condemning the Putin regime and the Russian invasion of Ukraine."

Independent of this criticism, the game's music composer Mick Gordon released a statement condemning the war and donating his fee from the project to the Red Cross Ukraine Crisis appeal.

Reception 

Atomic Heart received "generally favorable" reviews for the PC version, while Xbox Series X and PlayStation 5 versions received "mixed or average" reviews, according to review aggregator Metacritic. 

IGN praised Atomic Heart for being "deeply ambitious, highly imaginative, and consistently impressive", though criticized its writing and "tedious" elements of gameplay, such as fetch quests. PC Gamer called it "one of the oddest" AAA games. They felt it took primary influence from BioShock, but criticized its combat and progression system as inferior, while being conflicted towards the story and characters. Similarly, Polygon felt that Atomic Heart failed to eclipse BioShock through its gameplay and attempts to tackle multiple themes at once.

References

External links
 

2023 video games
Alternate history video games
Communism in fiction
Dystopian video games
First-person shooters
Focus Entertainment games
Open-world video games
PlayStation 4 games
PlayStation 5 games
Retrofuturistic video games
Science fiction games
Single-player video games
Unreal Engine games
Video game controversies
Video games developed in Russia
Video games scored by Mick Gordon
Video games set in 1955
Video games set in the Soviet Union
Video games with alternate endings
Windows games
Xbox One games
Xbox Series X and Series S games